Stanhope may refer to:

In arts and entertainment
 Stanhope essay prize, at Oxford University
 Stanhope College, a fictional college attended by Supergirl

People

 Stanhope (name), a surname and given name
 Earl Stanhope, a hereditary title held by seven people since 1718
 Spencer-Stanhope family, a family of British landed gentry
 Earl of Harrington, a title in the Peerage of Great Britain

Places

Australia
 Stanhope, Victoria, Australia
 Stanhope Gardens, New South Wales, Australia

Canada
 Stanhope, Prince Edward Island, Canada
 Stanhope, Quebec, Canada
 Stanhope, Newfoundland and Labrador, Canada

UK
 Stanhope, County Durham, England
 Stanhope, Kent, England
 Stanhope, Peeblesshire, Scotland

United States
 Stanhope, Iowa
 Stanhope, Kentucky
 Stanhope, New Jersey
 Stanhope, Ohio
 Stanhope, a Mississippi landmark
 Stanhope Hotel, in New York City

In transportation
 Stanhope (carriage), a horse-drawn gig, buggy or light phaeton 
 Stanhope (railways), third class passenger vehicles on early British railways
 Stanhope body, a car body style
 Stanhope, an automobile manufactured from 1904 to 1906 by the Twyford Motor Car Company

Other uses
 Stanhope (optical bijou), a type of photographic lens used in novelty collectibles
 Stanhopea, a genus of the orchid family
 Stanhope plc, English property developer
 Stanhope press, an early cast iron printing press
 First Stanhope–Sunderland Ministry, in British history
 Second Stanhope–Sunderland Ministry, in British history